McFarland (formerly, Hunt and Lone Pine) is a city in the San Joaquin Valley, in Kern County, California, United States. The population of McFarland was 12,707 at the 2010 census and an estimated 15,506 as of 2019.

History

In the early 1900s, an educator named James Boyd McFarland moved to the Anaheim area from Zanesville, Ohio, to try his hand at real estate and walnut farming.

McFarland visited Kern County in 1907 and was impressed with the land's crop-growing potential near a community called Hunt's Siding, which was a small agriculture and livestock-based community that served about 50 families. With help from Bakersfield real estate businessman William Laird, McFarland bought 50 acres at the location of what is now McFarland.

The first post office opened in 1908. The town was founded in 1909 (and later became incorporated in 1957). McFarland grew tremendously during the Great Depression of the 1930s, then the population tapered off during World War II.

In 1950, Highway 99 (then U.S. Route 99), the major corridor of the Central Valley, was constructed, which ended up dividing the town into an east side and west side. McFarland incorporated as a city in the summer of 1957. The name honors J.B. McFarland, the city's founder.

In 2009 the city re-established its police force after decades of relying on the Kern County Sheriff.

In 2015, the movie McFarland USA was released, based on a true story that occurred at McFarland High School. McFarland USA follows the McFarland Cross Country team and their coach James White (portrayed by Kevin Costner). The cross country team would go on to win 9 state titles.

Demographics

2016
According to Data USA, the demographics of McFarland in 2016 were as follows:
 Population: 13,391 (up 2.79%)
 Median Age: 25.6 years
 Median Household Income: $33,687 (down 1.01%)
 Poverty Rate: 37.7%
 Employment Count: 4,298 (up 1.66%)
 Median Property Value: $136,700 (up 13.7%)
(all changes relative to 2015)

2010
At the 2010 census McFarland had a population of 12,707. The racial makeup of McFarland was 5,433 (42.8%) White, 236 (1.9%) African American, 171 (1.3%) Native American, 84 (0.7%) Asian, 6 (0.0%) Pacific Islander, 6,330 (49.8%) from other races, and 447 (3.5%) from two or more races. Hispanic or Latino of any race were 11,625 people (91.5%).

The census reported that 11,486 people (90.4% of the population) lived in households, 27 (0.2%) lived in non-institutionalized group quarters, and 1,194 (9.4%) were institutionalized.

There were 2,599 households, 1,818 (69.9%) had children under the age of 18 living in them, 1,663 (64.0%) were opposite-sex married couples living together, 456 (17.5%) had a female householder with no husband present, 246 (9.5%) had a male householder with no wife present. There were 189 (7.3%) unmarried opposite-sex partnerships, and 14 (0.5%) same-sex married couples or partnerships. 170 households (6.5%) were one person and 71 (2.7%) had someone living alone who was 65 or older. The average household size was 4.42. There were 2,365 families (91.0% of households); the average family size was 4.51.

The age distribution was 4,468 people (35.2%) under the age of 18, 1,700 people (13.4%) aged 18 to 24, 4,030 people (31.7%) aged 25 to 44, 1,925 people (15.1%) aged 45 to 64, and 584 people (4.6%) who were 65 or older. The median age was 25.7 years. For every 100 females, there were 128.3 males.  For every 100 females age 18 and over, there were 142.4 males.

There were 2,683 housing units at an average density of 1,005.6 per square mile, of the occupied units 1,488 (57.3%) were owner-occupied and 1,111 (42.7%) were rented. The homeowner vacancy rate was 0.9%; the rental vacancy rate was 2.6%. 6,519 people (51.3% of the population) lived in owner-occupied housing units and 4,967 people (39.1%) lived in rental housing units.

2000
At the 2000 census there were 9,618 people in 1,990 households, including 1,789 families, in the city. The racial makeup of the city was 28.49% White, 3.19% Black or African American, 1.63% Native American, 0.69% Asian, 0.08% Pacific Islander, 61.23% from other races, and 4.69% from two or more races. 85.66% of the population were Hispanic or Latino of any race.
Of the 1,990 households 61.7% had children under the age of 18 living with them, 64.4% were married couples living together, 17.3% had a female householder with no husband present, and 10.1% were non-families. 7.7% of households were one person and 4.7% were one person aged 65 or older. The average household size was 4.30 and the average family size was 4.45.

The age distribution was 35.1% under the age of 18, 14.1% from 18 to 24, 33.1% from 25 to 44, 12.8% from 45 to 64, and 4.8% 65 or older. The median age was 25 years. For every 100 females, there were 132.2 males. For every 100 females age 18 and over, there were 151.5 males.

The median income for a household in the city was $12,821, and the median family income  was $14,190. Males had a median income of $19,881 versus $9,109 for females. The per capita income for the city was $9,524. About 34.1% of families and 35.2% of the population were below the poverty line, including 41.1% of those under age 18 and 12.1% of those age 65 or over.

Local parks
Arturo J. Munoz Park
Ritchey Park
McFarland Park
Browning Road Park
Blanco Park

Schools
Kern Avenue Elementary School
Browning Road Elementary School
McFarland Middle School
McFarland High School
San Joaquin High School (continuation)
McFarland Independent School
Horizon Elementary

Churches
Sherwood Avenue Baptist Church
Saint Elizabeth Catholic Church
El Buen Pastor Church
Iglesia Ni Cristo
Jehovah's Witnesses 124
Church of the Living Savior
Church of Jesus Christ of Latter-day Saints
Mcfarland Apostolic Assembly
 CrossPointe Baptist Church  McFarland

References

External links
 
 Greater McFarland Chamber of Commerce

Cities in Kern County, California
1957 establishments in California
Incorporated cities and towns in California
San Joaquin Valley
Populated places established in 1957